Sachse Rocks is a group of submerged rocks which lie close to the northern coast of the island of Bouvetoya and approximately 0.2 miles (0.3 km) southeast of Cape Valdivia. The rocks were charted and named by the Norwegian expedition, 1927–28, under Captain Harald Horntvedt. Named for Walter Sachse, a navigation officer on the German vessel SS Valdivia  who in 1898 accurately fixed the position of the island for the first time.

References

Other sources
Simpson-Housley, Paul  (2002)	Antarctica: Exploration, Perception and Metaphor	(Routledge) 

Rock formations of Bouvet Island